The Hertford and District Football League is a football competition based in England founded in 1910. It has a total of three divisions including the Hertford and District League Premier Division, which sits at level 13 of the English football league system and is a feeder to the Hertfordshire Senior County League.

Clubs are affiliated to several county FA's including Hertfordshire FA, Essex FA, Bedfordshire FA and the London FA.

Recent Divisional Champions

Member clubs 2019-20

Premier Division
Allenbury's Sports First
Bocas Jogabonito First
Broxbourne Badgers First
Highlands FC (Middx) First
Inter Hoddesdon First
Lions FC First
Mill Lane FC First
North Weald Athletic First
Waltham Abbey A
Westmill First

Division One
Albury First
Bengeo Trinity Reserves
Letchworth FC First
MKS Carpentry First
Nazeing First
Sheering First
Stotford Junior Town (Sat)
Thundridge United (HDL) First
Ware Trinity First
Watton-at-Stone First
Wormley Rovers Veterans

Division Two
Buffs FC (Saturday) First
Bullys Crusaders Saturday
Buntingford Wanderers FC First
Elizabeth Allen Old Boys First
Greenbury United First
Hertford Heath First
Mangrove First
Much Hadham First
Stotford Junior Town Reserves (Sat)
Waltham Abbey B

External links
Hertford and District Football League

 
Football in Hertfordshire
Football leagues in England
Sports leagues established in 1910
1910 establishments in England
Sport in Hertford